Shah Bandar or Shahbandar may refer to:

 Shahbandar (Persian: , lit. “harbourmaster”), was an official of the ports in Safavid Persia
 Shahbandar (Pakistan), a town in Thatta District, Sindh, Pakistan
 Shahabandar, village in Karnataka, India
 Shabandar, a village in Lorestan, Iran
 Abd al-Rahman Shahbandar (1879–1940), Syrian politician
 Samira Shahbandar (born 1946), flight attendant and second wife of Saddam Hussein
 Iqbal Shahbandri or Iqbal Bhatkal (born 1970), leader of the Indian Mujahideen
 Riyaz Ismail Shahbandri or Riyaz Bhatkal (born 1978), leader of the Indian Mujahideen

See also
 
 
 Bandar Shah, a city in Golestan, Iran